Marcel Chandrawinata (born March 29, 1987) is an Indonesian actor and model best known for his role in film Alexandria co-starring with actress Julie Estelle.

Early life 
Chandrawinata was born in Hannover, Germany. His father is Chinese-Indonesian and Javanese and his mother is German. He has two siblings: twin identical brother Mischa, who also an actor, and elder sister Nadine Chandrawinata, an actress and beauty queen. His family later moved to Indonesia after his birth.

Chandrawinata is a Catholic. He attended 'Ora et Labora Elementary School' and 'Tirta Martha BPK Penabur Protestant High School'. After graduating from high school, he continued his studies at Pelita Harapan University, majoring in Industrial Engineering.

Career 
Chandrawinata started his career as a teen model before turning his attention to acting. He had appeared in several Indonesian movies including Catatan Akhir Sekolah (2005), Alexandria (2006), Summer Breeze (2008), Air Terjun Pengantin (2009) and Pupus (2011).

He also starred in soap operas, "Cowok Impian", "Selamat Jalan Natasya", "Mawar", "Alisa", "Air Mata Cinta" and "Rama dan Ramona".

References

1987 births
Indonesian male film actors
German people of Chinese descent
German people of Indonesian descent
German Roman Catholics
Indonesian people of Chinese descent
Indonesian Roman Catholics
Indo people
Javanese people
Living people
People from Jakarta
Indonesian twins
Pelita Harapan University alumni